Coelia is a genus of orchids (family Orchidaceae, tribe Epidendreae, subtribe Calypsoinae). It had previously been tentatively classified as the only genus of the subtribe Coeliinae of the tribe Epidendreae.

Species
It contains 5 species, native to Mexico, Central America and the West Indies.

References

External links
 
 

 
Calypsoinae genera